Fernando Ferrer is a Venezuelan Paralympian athlete competing mainly in category T11 sprint events.

Fernando competed in the T12 100m at the 2008 Summer Paralympics in Beijing, he also went on to win a silver medal with his Venezuelan teammates in the T11-13 4 × 100 m behind host nation China.

External links
 profile on paralympic.org

Paralympic athletes of Venezuela
Athletes (track and field) at the 2008 Summer Paralympics
Paralympic silver medalists for Venezuela
Living people
Year of birth missing (living people)
Medalists at the 2008 Summer Paralympics
Paralympic medalists in athletics (track and field)
Venezuelan male sprinters
21st-century Venezuelan people
20th-century Venezuelan people